Surasak Tungsurat  is a Thailand football player defender who played for Thailand in the 1992 Asian Cup.

Honours

Player
Thailand
 Sea Games  Winner (1); 1993
 Runner-Up (1); 1991

Manager
Muangthong United
 Thai Division 1 League  Champions (1); 2008

External links

References

  

1965 births
Living people
Surasak Tungsurat
Surasak Tungsurat
Surasak Tungsurat
Association football fullbacks
Surasak Tungsurat
Surasak Tungsurat
Surasak Tungsurat
Surasak Tungsurat
Surasak Tungsurat
Thailand national football team managers
Place of birth missing (living people)
Surasak Tungsurat
Surasak Tungsurat
Southeast Asian Games medalists in football
Competitors at the 1991 Southeast Asian Games
Competitors at the 1993 Southeast Asian Games
1992 AFC Asian Cup players